Los Chinos de Ponce (English: "The Chinesemen of Ponce"), formally King's Cream, is an Ice cream parlor located at Calle Marina 9322 in the city of Ponce, Puerto Rico, in front of the town square, Plaza Degetau, opposite the historic Parque de Bombas. Critics have called the site "a Puerto Rican institution" and its ice cream "the Caribbean's best." It has also been called "Puerto Rico's most famous ice cream stand." Another critic called it "[the reason] for which I'll always remember Ponce."

History

Their owners/founders were Alfredo Louk, originally from Guangzhou, China (Canton in Spanish), and his wife Violeta Chang de Louk, a Cuban woman of Chinese immigrant parents. The couple had fled the Fidel Castro government and established themselves in Ponce in 1963.

They opened the first King's Cream store in 1964. It was located at 61 Calle Vives, between Calle Union and Calle Atocha. A second outlet of the same company opened three blocks away across Plaza Las Delicias on Calle Marina a few years later.

Offering
The store has an array of local flavors, including pineapple, parcha (passion fruit), coconut, guanabana (soursop), tamarind, acerola, peanut, maize, and almond in addition to the traditional vanilla and chocolate flavors.

See also

 List of Puerto Rico Landmarks
 Chinese immigration to Puerto Rico
 Piragua

References

Further reading
 Lee-Borges, José. Los Chinos en Puerto Rico. (In Spanish) Second Edition. Ediciones Callejón. 2015. 437 pages. .

External links
 Photo of King's Ice Cream at Calle Marina 9322
 Photo of King's Ice Cream outlet at 61 Vives Street
 King's (Ice) Cream official menu list

Companies based in Ponce, Puerto Rico
Privately held companies of Puerto Rico
Puerto Rican brands
Food and drink companies of Puerto Rico
Restaurants established in 1964
Ice cream parlors
1964 in Puerto Rico
1964 establishments in Puerto Rico
Tourist attractions in Ponce, Puerto Rico
Barrio Tercero